Ghadduwah is a Saharan desert oasis town in the Fezzan region of southwest Libya.

See also 
 List of cities in Libya

References 

Populated places in Sabha District
Oases of Libya